Kalinowski was a notable Polish noble family that belonged to a limited and small circle of Magnates of Poland and Lithuania.

History
Like many other noble families of the Kingdom of Poland, the Grand Duchy of Lithuania, and the Duchy of Ruthenia, they played a prominent role in Polish, and to a lesser extent, in Belarusian history. They were descended from Andrzej Kalinowski (1465 – 1531) and used the Kalinowa coat of arms. On 17 August 1818, the family was awarded the title of Count in the Austrian Empire.

Notable members
 Marcin Kalinowski (ca 1605 - 1652)

Notable people with the same surname, but not part of that family
Raphael Kalinowski (September 1, 1835, Vilna - November 15, 1907, Wadowice)

Coat of arms

The family used the Kalinowa Coat of Arms.

See also 

Czernihów Voivodeship
Lucio Bini
Albin Dunajewski
Ostrołęka

References

External links 
Kalinowski

 
Kalinowski
Kalinowski